Team PCW was a Russian professional cycling team, which competed in elite road bicycle racing events such as the UCI Women's Road World Cup. For the 2010 season, the team merged with Petrogradets.

Major wins

2005
Stage 3 Giro della Toscana Int. Femminile, Svetlana Bubnenkova 
Stages 2, 3, 4 & 5 Tour Cycliste Féminin Ardèche, Svetlana Bubnenkova 
Stage 8 Giro d'Italia Femminile, Svetlana Bubnenkova 
 Overall Giro del Trentino Alto Adige-Südtirol, Svetlana Bubnenkova 
Stage 2, Svetlana Bubnenkova 
 Overall Emakumeen Bira, Svetlana Bubnenkova 
Stage 1, Svetlana Bubnenkova 
Stage 7 Tour de l'Aude, Yuliya Martisova

2006
 Overall Giro della Toscana Int. Femminile, Svetlana Bubnenkova 
Stage 5, Svetlana Bubnenkova 
Stage 8 La Route de France Féminine, Svetlana Bubnenkova 
Stages 3, 4 & 6 Giro d'Italia Femminile, Olga Slyusareva
 Overall Giro del Trentino Alto Adige-Südtirol, Svetlana Bubnenkova 
Stages 1 & 2, Svetlana Bubnenkova 
 Overall Giro di San Marino, Svetlana Bubnenkova 
Stage 2, Svetlana Bubnenkova 
Stage 7 Tour de l'Aude Cycliste Féminin, Olga Zabelinskaya

2007
Criterium des Championnes, Natalia Boyarskaya

2008
 Overall Tour Féminin en Limousin, Natalia Boyarskaya
Stage 3, Natalia Boyarskaya
Stage 2 Tour de Bretagne, Joanne Kiesanowski
Grand Prix Elsy Jacobs, Monia Baccaille

2009 
 Overall Vuelta Femenina a Costa Rica, Evelyn García
Stages 1, 2 (ITT) & 5
Grand Prix Elsy Jacobs, Svetlana Bubnenkova

2011
Stage 4 Tour de Bretagne Féminin, Anna Potokina
Prologue Gracia–Orlová, Svetlana Bubnenkova 
Stage 1 Gracia–Orlová, Natalia Boyarskaya

National & Continental Champions
2005
 Russia Time Trial, Svetlana Bubnenkova 
 Russia Road Race, Yuliya Martisova

2007
 Russia Time Trial, Tatiana Antoshina 
 Russia Road Race, Natalia Boyarskaya
 Luxembourg Road Race, Suzie Godart

2008
 Ireland Road Race, Siobhan Horgan

2009
 El Salvador Road Race, Evelyn García
 El Salvador Time Trial, Evelyn García
	
2010
 European U23 Time Trial, Alexandra Burchenkova

References

Defunct cycling teams based in Russia
Defunct cycling teams based in Italy
UCI Women's Teams
Cycling teams established in 2004
Cycling teams disestablished in 2011
2004 establishments in Italy
2011 disestablishments in Russia